Hangwa is a general term for traditional Korean confections. With tteok (rice cakes), hangwa forms the sweet food category in Korean cuisine. Common ingredients of hangwa include grain flour, fruits and roots, sweet ingredients such as honey and yeot, and spices such as cinnamon and ginger.

Names 
Hangwa translates to "Korean confectionery" referring to traditional confections contrasting with yanggwa, which identifies  "Western confectionery". In the past hangwa was called jogwa which means "artificial fruit" or gwajeongnyu as meaning "fruit food category".

History 
The history of hangwa goes back to the era of the three kingdoms (57 BCE ‒ 668 CE), when various types of confections were consumed by royals during festivities, national holidays or in court, according to the Memorabilia of the Three Kingdoms.

Passing the two Buddhist dynasties, Unified Silla in the era of two kingdoms (698–926) and Goryeo (936‒1392), the cultivation of crops and consumption of confections increased drastically as the Buddhist diets forbade meat. Confections were offered in Goryeo's national feasts, rites, ceremonies, and banquets, including the two Buddhist festivals, the Lotus Lantern Festival and the Festival of the Eight Vows. Prevailing tea ceremonies also required more types of confections.

Concerns regarding the increasingly excessive use of confections that have large amounts of oil, grain, and honey have consequently lead to several regulations throughout the course of its history. In 1117, King Sukjong issued a restriction on the extravagant usage of deep-fried grain confections. In 1192, it was commanded to replace deep-fried grain confections with fruits. In 1353, a total ban was placed on deep-fried grain confections.

Restrictions continued in the Joseon (1392‒1897), according to Comprehensive Collection of the National Codes that recorded that the use of deep-fried grain confections was restricted solely for rites, weddings, and toasts to longevity. Commoners caught eating them on occasions other than that were subjected to monetary fines or corporal punishment.

Categories 
Hangwa can be classified into eight main categories, namely dasik (tea food), gwapyeon (fruit jelly), jeonggwa (fruit jerky), suksil-gwa, yeot-gangjeong, yugwa, yumil-gwa, and candies.
 Candies – Traditional Korean candies can be eaten as they are, or used as sweetening ingredients in other types of hangwa. Dang ("candy") or  Dangryu ("candy category") refers to hard and sweet confection. It can be made of crystallized sugar, or saccharified starch. Yeot is a traditional sweet in either liquid or solid form, as a syrup, taffy, or candy. It is made with grains such rice, glutinous rice, glutinous sorghum, corn, sweet potatoes, by saccharifying them using barley malt.
 Dasik, literally "tea food", is a bite-size sweet that is normally accompanied by tea. It is made by pressing honied powder into a decorative mold. Typical ingredients include rice flour, pine pollen, black sesame, chestnut, and soybean.
 Gwapyeon is a jelly-like summer dessert made with fruits. Gwapyeon can be made with a variety of fruit, including berries, cherries, and apricots. Gwapyeon is made by mixing fruit juice to starch and agar to attain a gelatinous consistency.
 Jeonggwa is a crispy, chewy sweet made of candied fruits, roots, or seeds. Common ingredients include yuja, quince, apricot, lotus root, radish, carrot, ginseng, balloon flower root, ginger, burdock root, bamboo shoot, and winter melon.
 Suksil-gwa, literally "cooked fruit", is a consisting of cooked fruit, roots, or seeds sweetened with honey. Common ingredients include chestnut, jujube, and ginger. Suksil-gwa is similar to—and sometimes classified as—jeonggwa, but has unique characteristics that differentiate it from the jeonggwa category.
 Yeot-gangjeong is a confection made by mixing toasted seeds, nuts, beans, or popped grains with rice syrup and cut into desired shapes. Common ingredients are pine nuts, walnuts, peanuts, sesame or perilla seeds, and popped rice.
 Yugwa is a deep-fried confection made with glutinous rice flour dough. It can be classified into gangjeong, sanja, and hangwa depending on the shapes and size.
 Yumil-gwa refers to deep-fried confection made of wheat flour dough. It may be made of various ingredients such as honey, cooking oil, cinnamon powder, nuts and cheongju (rice wine). It can be classified into mandu-gwa (dumplings), maejap-gwa (ribbons), and yakgwa (flower) according to the cooking methods.
Other hangwa varieties include:
 Gotgam-mari is a roll made of dried persimmons and walnuts. It can be made by rolling a toasted and peeled walnut with a dried, deseeded, and flattened persimmon, then slicing each roll like slicing a gimbap.
 Kkultarae is a hangwa made by meticulously pulling yeot into fine strands, then wrapping candied nuts with the "hair".
 Yaksik, also called yakbap, is a sweet rice dessert made with steamed glutinous rice mixed with honey, soy sauce, jujubes, chestnuts, pine nuts, and sesame oil.

Occasions 
Traditionally, hangwa was offered during jesa (ancestrial rites), chuseok (harvest festival), geolhonshik (weddings) or hwanggap (sixtieth-birthday) celebrations. Today hangwa can be purchased online, in markets, coffee shops or at tea houses.

Modern Times 
In the 1900s, hangwa began to fall out of favor with the introduction of sugar and western confection. In recent years, it has seen a revitalization and is associated with holiday food. With the rising demand for hangwa, this market has seen increased support from the Ministry of Agriculture, Forestry, and Fishery. Today, it is offered as ceremonial food and is often gifted especially during seollal (Korean New Years).  As society has sought healthier alternatives in consumable goods, efforts to produce confections to stimulate wellness began. Healthier hangwa was created by adding ginseng, green tea, and laver.

See also 
 Chinese desserts – Chinese confections
 Wagashi – Japanese confections
 List of Korean desserts

References 

 
Confectionery
Korean cuisine